Zavoyko may refer to:
Vasily Zavoyko (1809–1898), Russian admiral

Zavoyko, name of the town of Yelizovo in 1897–1924